Teresa Marta Ruiz Penella (29 July 1939 – 11 August 2017), better known as Terele Pávez, was a Spanish actress. She appeared in more than ninety films since 1954.

She died on 11 August 2017 due to a stroke at the age of 78.

Selected filmography

 Boyfriend in Sight (1954) - Pecas
 15 bajo la lona (1959) - Manuela
 Las dos y media y... veneno (1959) - Chica morena en consulta veterinaria
 Tenemos 18 años (1959) - Pili
 Salto mortal (1962) - Camarera
 La cuarta ventana (1963) - Linda Barcala
 El espontáneo (1964) - Situada
 La boda era a las doce (1964) - María José
 No somos de piedra (1968) - Charito Sánchez
 Los escondites (1969)
 Fortunata y Jacinta (1970) - Mauricia la Dura
 Matrimonio al desnudo (1974) - Embarazada
 The Marriage Revolution (1974) - Secretaria de Pedro
 Como matar a papá... sin hacerle daño (1975) - Pepita
 Malocchio (1975) - Walter's wife
 La espada negra (1976) - Reina Madre
 Carne apaleada (1978) - Lourdes
 Tatuaje (1978)
 Oro rojo (1978) - Rufa
 Las siete magníficas y audaces mujeres (1979)
 El camino dorado (1979) - Mujer Juan
 The Holy Innocents (1984) - Régula
 Réquiem por un campesino español (1985) - Jerónima
 La noche de la ira (1986) - Prostituta
 El hermano bastardo de Dios (1986) - Ramona
 Delirios de amor (1986) - Mujer en funeral (segment "Delirio 1")
 Laura, del cielo llega la noche (1987) - Teresa
 Rumbo norte (1987)
 El Lute II: Tomorrow I'll be Free (1988) - Gitana
 Diario de invierno (1988) - Madre
 El aire de un crimen (1988) - Mujer peón
 Los días del cometa (1989)
 The Greek Labyrinth (1993) - Esposa de Dotrós
 The Day of the Beast (1995) - Rosario
 La Celestina (1996) - Celestina
 99.9 (1997) - Dolores
 La comunidad (2000) - Ramona
 800 Bullets (2002) - Rocío
 Nudos (2003) - Marga
 Mala uva (2004) - Reyes
 Café solo o con ellas (2007) - Paca
 Los Totenwackers (2007) - Sabrina
 El secreto de la abuela (2007) - Elizabeth
 The Last Circus (2010) - Dolores (Vet.)
 Witching & Bitching (2013) - Maritxu
 My Big Night (2015) - Dolores
 Las aventuras de Moriana (2015) - Terele
 Herederos de la bestia (2016) - Herself
 La puerta abierta (2016) - Antonia
 El bar (2017) - Amparo
 Incerta glòria (2017) - Molinera
 ¡Ay, mi madre! (2019) - Petra
 Caribe 'Todo incluído' (2020) -  Reme (final film role)

References

External links 

1939 births
2017 deaths
Spanish film actresses
20th-century Spanish actresses
21st-century Spanish actresses
People from Bilbao